Honeymoon is a 1928 silent film comedy produced and distributed by MGM and directed by Robert A. Golden. It stars Polly Moran, Harry Gribbon and Bert Roach.

It is a surviving film.

Plot

Cast
Polly Moran - Polly
Harry Gribbon - Harry
Bert Roach - Bert
Flash the Dog - Flash
Dick Sutherland - Uncredited Bit

References

External links

lobby poster/card(Wayback Machine)
 australian daybill long poster (ha auctions)

1928 films
American silent feature films
Metro-Goldwyn-Mayer films
1928 comedy films
Silent American comedy films
American black-and-white films
1920s American films
Films with screenplays by Richard Schayer